Mo Honey Mo Problems is an extended play by American DJ and producer Bear Grillz. The song "Going Down" received over 100,000 plays in less than a week.

Track listing

Charts

References 

2016 EPs